Dick Building, also known as the Cornerstone Building, is a historic commercial and apartment building located at West Newton, Westmoreland County, Pennsylvania.  The original section was built in 1890, with an addition made between 1910 and 1925.  It is a three-story, "L"-shaped brick building executed in the Romanesque Revival style. It features a corner semi-circular turret with a conical roof.  The building once housed a bank on its first floor.

It was added to the National Register of Historic Places in 2007.

References

Commercial buildings on the National Register of Historic Places in Pennsylvania
Romanesque Revival architecture in Pennsylvania
Commercial buildings completed in 1890
Residential buildings completed in 1890
Buildings and structures in Westmoreland County, Pennsylvania
National Register of Historic Places in Westmoreland County, Pennsylvania
1890 establishments in Pennsylvania